The 1974 Ohio gubernatorial election was held on November 5, 1974. Republican nominee Jim Rhodes narrowly defeated Democratic incumbent John J. Gilligan with 48.62% of the vote.

Primary elections
Primary elections were held on May 7, 1974.

Democratic primary

Candidates
John J. Gilligan, incumbent Governor
James D. Nolan

Results

Republican primary

Candidates
Jim Rhodes, former Governor
Charles E. Fry, State Representative
Bert Dawson Jr.

Results

General election

Candidates
Major party candidates
Jim Rhodes, Republican 
John J. Gilligan, Democratic

Other candidates
Nancy B. Lazar, Independent

Results

References

1974
Ohio
Gubernatorial